The Arizona Wildcats college football team competes as part of the National Collegiate Athletic Association (NCAA) Division I Football Bowl Subdivision (FBS), representing the University of Arizona in the South Division of the Pac-12 Conference (Pac-12). Since the establishment of the team in 1893, Arizona has appeared in 21 bowl games and had 9 wins, 11 losses, and 1 tie for a .452 winning percentage. One of their losses was to Boise State in one of the New Year's Six bowl games, the Fiesta Bowl.

Key

Post-season games

Record by bowl game and opponents

Notes

References
General

Specific

Arizona

Arizona Wildcats bowl games